El Cuatrero (born 1996) is a Mexican luchador enmascarado, or masked professional wrestler currently signed to Lucha Libre AAA Worldwide but is inactive due to incarceration. Best known for his work for Consejo Mundial de Lucha Libre (CMLL) based in Mexico City. He is the son of lucha libre legend Cien Caras and the nephew of Máscara Año 2000 and Universo 2000. Cuatrero, his brother Sansón and their cousin Forastero form a trio known as Nueva Generación Dinamita ("New Generation Dynamite"). NGD are presented as the successors to Los Hermanos Dinamita, which was formed by Cien Caras, Máscara Año 2000 and Universo 2000. His real name is not a matter of public record, as is often the case with masked wrestlers in Mexico where their private lives are kept a secret from the wrestling fans. His ring name is Spanish for "The Horsethief" or  "The Cattle Rustler", reflected in the cowboy-inspired ring gear and mask he wears during shows.

El Cuatrero is one time CMLL World Middleweight Champion, one third of the Mexican National Trios Championship (with Sansón and Forastero) and the Occidente Trios Championship (with Sansón and Forastero). At one point, he held four championships simultaneously, as he and Sansón also held the CMLL Arena Coliseo Tag Team Championship as well. He won the mask of Ángel de Oro in the main event of CMLL's 2018 Homenaje a Dos Leyendas show on March 16, 2018.

Personal life
El Cuatrero was born in 1996, son of professional wrestler Carmelo Reyes González, better known under the ring name Cien Caras ("100 Faces"). His older brother, known as Sansón ("Samson"), was born in 1994. His uncles Jesús (known as Máscara Año 2000) and Andrés Reyes González (Universo 2000) were also professional wrestlers. Several of the Reyes sons followed their fathers into professional wrestling, including Forastero, Universo 2000 Jr. and Máscara Año 2000 Jr. Initially, Carmelo Reyes did not want his sons to become professional wrestlers, wanting them to get an education instead. He reluctantly agreed that they could learn Lucha Libre from their uncle Andrés, but only as a hobby, not a career. During their training, Carmelo noticed how seriously both sons took the business and reluctantly agreed to let them become professional wrestlers.

There is a long tradition of wrestlers paying for the right to use a ring name in Mexican wrestling, including being allowed to portray a second or third-generation wrestler without being related to the originator of the ring character. It has been confirmed that wrestlers Cien Caras Jr. and El Hijo de Cien Caras are unrelated to the Reyes family, while it is unclear if Hijo de Máscara Año 2000 is actually a blood relative or if the relationship is purely fictional. Carmelo Reyes later stated that he allowed the "Cien Caras" name to be rented by other wrestlers as his sons were very young and might not want to become professional wrestlers.

On March 4, 2023, CMLL wrestler Stephanie Vaquer filed a domestic violence criminal complaint against El Cuatrero, who had worked with her in the past for CMLL. According to the complaint, Cuatrero forced onto her by choking her and throwing her against a wall. On March 9, Consejo Mundial de Lucha Libre released a statement stating that they "energetically condemn any form of violence against women and reiterate our commitment to promote a life free of violence and harassment in our staff and attendees to our arenas." On March 10, after a show for AAA in the city of Aguascalientes, El Cuatrero was arrested on an arrest warrant in Mexico City and charged with attempted femicide and domestic violence.

Professional wrestling career

While the El Cuatrero name was first used in 2014, Sansón said that he and his brother made their in-ring debut around the year 2010 and worked locally in Lagos de Moreno while finishing school. In an interview Cuatrero said that he wrestled briefly as "Máscara Universal", but his father did not like the name and suggested the name "El Cuatrero", Spanish for "The Cattle Rustler", instead. The "El Cuatrero" character was inspired by the cowboy gimmick that his father and his uncles had used during their careers. During their time working locally in Lagos de Moreno, the duo won their first Lucha de Apuestas, or bet match, when they defeated Los Centellas (I and II). As a result, Los Centellas had to unmask per lucha libre traditions.

Consejo Mundial de Lucha Libre (2014–2021)
The Reyes  brothers wrestled locally until early 2014, when they began working in Guadalajara for the local Consejo Mundial de Lucha Libre (CMLL) promoters at the Arena Coliseo. They trained at the CMLL wrestling school under Último Guerrero, Virus, and Franco Colombo. The Reyes brothers made their CMLL debut on March 25, 2014, where they, along with Universo 2000, lost to the trio of Blue Panther, Sagrado, and Valiente. While working in Guadalajara, El Cuatrero and Sansón competed in a tournament to determine the number one contenders for the local Occidente Tag Team Championship, but they were eliminated by the team of Flash and Flash II. The brothers teamed up with Jocker for a tournament where the winners would be crowned the new Occidente Trios Champions. While they won their way to the finale, they were defeated by Furia Roja, Mr. Trueno, and Ray Trueno. On November 11, 2015, Cuatrero and Sansón teamed up with their cousin Forastero and won the Occidente Trios Championship.

On January 5, 2017, El Cuatrero worked his first match in Mexico City, wrestling at the company's main venue, Arena Mexico. He participated in the 2017 version of La Copa Junior but was eliminated from the tournament before the finals. At that point, the Reyes brothers began being referred to as Nueva Generación Dinamita (Spanish for "New Generation Dynamites"; NGD)—a reference to their heritage. On March 18, 2016, Nueva Generación Dinamita worked their first major show for CMLL, defeating Soberano Jr. and Oro Jr. in the opening match of that year's Homenaje A Dos Leyendas supercard show. CMLL decided to have both El Cuatrero and Sansón participate in their annual Torneo Gran Alternativa ("Great Alternativa Tournament"), where younger wrestlers team up with established veteran wrestlers for the tournament. El Cuatrero was paired with Rey Bucanero, but the duo lost to Tritón and Místico in the first round. A year later, El Cuatrero was teamed up with his uncle Máscara Año 2000 for the 2017 version of the Torneo Gran Alternativa,  but like the 2016 tournament, El Cuatrero did not make it past the first round as the team lost to Esfinge and Atlantis. While El Cuatrero's first years on the main roster had seen little success, July 2017 proved a turning point in how Nueva Generación Dinamita was booked. El Cuatrero and Sansón defeated Black Terry and Negro Navarro to win the CMLL Arena Coliseo Tag Team Championship, CMLL's second-highest ranked tag team championship. Three days later, the trio defeated Los Hijos del Infierno (Ephesto, Luciferno, and Mephisto) to win the Mexican National Trios Championship, making El Cuatrero a triple champion. The trio would go on to win CMLL's La Copa Dinastia tournament, defeating the trios of Blue Panther, Blue Panther Jr., The Panter, and then Dragon Lee, Místico, and Pierroth.

On January 19, 2018, as part of the annual 2018 Fantastica Mania tour of Japan, El Cuatrero defeated Ángel de Oro to win the CMLL World Middleweight Championship, holding four championships simultaneously. The match and championship change was the beginning of a long-running storyline feud between El Cuatrero and Ángel de Oro, where challenges for a Lucha de Apuestas match soon followed. On February 14, 2018, Nueva Generación Dinamita announced they were giving up the CMLL Arena Coliseo Tag Team Championship. The storyline explanation was that NGW wanted to focus on winning the CMLL World Tag Team Championship, a step up from the Arena Coliseo championship. The feud between El Cuatrero and Ángel de Oro reached its peak at the 2018 Homenaje a Dos Leyendas show, where both competitors put their mask on the line in the main event match of the night. El Cuatrero defeated Ángel de Oro two falls to one, forcing him to remove his mask as per lucha libre tradition. El Cuatrero would later make his first and second successful defense of the CMLL World Middleweight Championship against Ángel de Oro. At the CMLL 85th Anniversary Show, the Dinamita defeated Atlantis, El Soberano Jr., and Mistico as part of CMLL's most important show of the year. On November 6, 2018, Cuatrero made his third successful middleweight championship defense as he defeated Titán.

2019 was the first year that all three members of Nueva Generación Dinamita participated in the annual Fantastica Mania tour of Japan, capping off the tour with a successful Mexican National Trios Championship defense against Ángel de Oro, Atlantis, and Titán on its last day. 2019 also marked the first year that El Cuatrero participated in the Universal Championship, a tournament where all 16 participants held a championship recognized by CMLL. In the opening round, he defeated perennial rival Soberano Jr. before losing to Último Guerrero in the quarterfinals. For the 2019 Torneo Nacional de Parejas Increíbles ("National Incredible Teams Tournament"), Cuatrero was paired up with Místico, as a rudo (the "bad guy") and a tecnico (the "good guy") team up for the event. The odd couple defeated Hechicero and Stuka Jr., then Atlantis and Negro Casas, before ultimately losing to Último Guerrero and Volador Jr. in the semifinals. As part of the 66th anniversary of Arena Puebla, NGD successfully defended the Mexican National Trios Championship against Los Ingobernables (El Terrible, La Bestia del Ring, and Rush), in what was their tenth overall championship defense. In December, El Cuatrero made his fourth successful defense of the CMLL World Middleweight Championship as he defeated Carístico on December 12.

The 2020 Sin Piedad show offered Cuatrero the opportunity to become a quadruple champion once more, as he and Sansón challenged Místico and Carístico for the CMLL World Tag Team Championship but lost the match. During the 2020 Fantastica Mania tour, Cuatrero and his brother participated in the family tag team tournament, where they ended up defeating Los Hermanos Chavez (Ángel de Oro and Niebla Roja) in the finals. On the final day of the tour, January 20, NGD successfully defended the Mexican National Trios Championship against Los Hermanos Chávez and Titán. On February 24, 2020, El Cuatrero and Sansón won the Torneo de parejas familiares ("Family Team Tournament") as they defeated the uncle/nephew team of Rey Bucanero and Drone in the first round, the father/son team of Euforia and Soberano Jr. in the second round, and finally the Gran Guerrero/Último Guerrero brothers in the finals. On March 26, 2021, they defeated Los Guerreros Laguneros to win the CMLL World Trios Championship. On August 10, 2021, CMLL announced the departure of Nueva Generación Dinamita.

Independent circuit (2014–current)
While working for CMLL, Cuatrero, like all CMLL workers, is allowed to take independent circuit work on days he is not booked for a show or appearance by CMLL. On February 19, 2017, Cuatrero and Sansón unsuccessfully challenged Black Terry and Negro Navarro for the CMLL Arena Coliseo Tag Team Championship on a Lucha Memes show in Puebla. NGD also successfully defended the Mexican National Trios Championship against Los Kamikazes del Aire (Alas de Acero, Aramis, and Iron Kid) at a subsequent Lucha Memes show.

As part of CMLL's collaboration with The Crash Lucha Libre, Nueva Generación Dinamita has appeared on several The Crash shows over the years. In their initial appearance for The Crash, Nueva Generación Dinamita lost to La Rebelión Amarilla (Bestia 666, Jacob Fatu and Mecha Wolf 450). The team returned to The Crash for their VII Anniversary Show, where they lost to Los Lucha Bros (Penta El 0M and The King) in a match for The Crash Tag Team Championship that also included Reno Scum (Adam Thornstowe and Luster the Legend). They returned to The Crash in December 2018, losing to Bestia 666 and Garza Jr. in the main event. In 2019, Cuatrero and Sansón worked an extended storyline against Los Traumas (Trauma I and Trauma II) in The Crash. In June Sansón was forced to team up with Trauma I to face Cuatrero and Trauma I in a relevos increíbles ("incredible pairs" match), where the regular partners refused to wrestle against each other. In the end, Sansón and Trauma I won after Trauma II hit El Cuatrero during the match. This was followed by a tag team match where NGD defeated Los Traumas by disqualification as part of their ongoing storyline.

On June 16, 2019, Cuatrero, Forastero, and Sansón appeared at International Wrestling Revolution Group's annual Festival de las Máscaras show. The trio defeated their cousin Máscara Año 2000 Jr., who was teamed up with Capo del Sur and Capo del Norte.

Championships and accomplishments
Consejo Mundial de Lucha Libre
CMLL World Middleweight Championship (1 time)
CMLL World Trios Championship (1 time) - with Forastero and Sansón
CMLL Arena Coliseo Tag Team Championship (1 time) – with Sansón
Mexican National Trios Championship (1 time) – with Sansón and Forastero
Occidente Trios Championship (1 time) – with Sansón and Forastero
La Copa Dinastia (2017) – with Sansón and Forastero
Torneo de parejas familiares (2020) – with Sansón

Lucha Libre AAA Worldwide
AAA World Trios Championship (1 time) – with  Forastero and Sansón
Pro Wrestling Illustrated
Ranked No. 225 of the top 500 singles wrestlers in the PWI 500 in 2021
Other titles
Vive Latino Championship (1 time)

Luchas de Apuestas record

References

1996 births
Date of birth missing (living people)
Mexican male professional wrestlers
Masked wrestlers
Living people
Professional wrestlers from Jalisco
People from Lagos de Moreno, Jalisco
Unidentified wrestlers
AAA World Trios Champions
Mexican National Trios Champions
21st-century professional wrestlers
CMLL World Middleweight Champions
CMLL World Trios Champions